Peter Longerich (born 1955) is a German professor of history and German historian. He is regarded by fellow historians, including Ian Kershaw, Richard Evans, Timothy Snyder, Mark Roseman and Richard Overy, as one of the leading German authorities on the Holocaust.

Career
Longerich studied at the University of Munich and received a Ph.D. in history and an M.A. in history and sociology.

In 2002–03, Longerich was the third holder of the Visiting Chair at the Fritz Bauer Institute in Frankfurt. In 2003–04, he was J.B. and Maurice Shapiro Senior Scholar in Residence at the Centre for Advanced Holocaust Studies at the United States Holocaust Memorial Museum in Washington DC, where he worked on a biography of Heinrich Himmler. In 2005–06, he was a Fellow at the Wissenschaftszentrum Nordrhein-Westfalen.

Longerich was director of the Research Centre for the Holocaust and Twentieth-Century History at Royal Holloway, University of London (RHUL), where he worked alongside the late David Cesarani. In 2015, he left his position at Royal Holloway and returned to Germany. His major research interests include the history of the Weimar Republic, the Third Reich, the Second World War, the Holocaust,  Heinrich Himmler, and Joseph Goebbels.

He has appeared in the media to comment upon the links between Adolf Hitler and the Holocaust, as well as on related topics, and has published, in 2001, a book documenting Hitler's pivotal role in the Holocaust entitled The Unwritten Order. The book arose from his expert testimony at the David Irving trial. Reviewing Longerich's work, Timothy Snyder declared Holocaust "profound" and Heinrich Himmler: A Life "magnificent".

Published works
English
 
 
 
 
 
 
German
 (1989). Die braunen Bataillone. Geschichte der SA. Beck, Múnich. .
 (1992). Hitlers Stellvertreter. Führung der NSDAP und Kontrolle des Staatsapparates durch den Stab Heß und Bormanns Partei-Kanzlei. K.G. Saur. .
 (1998). Politik der Vernichtung. Eine Gesamtdarstellung der nationalsozialistischen Judenverfolgung. Piper: Munich. .
 (1998). Die Wannsee-Konferenz vom 20. Januar 1942. Planung und Beginn des Genozid an den Europäischen Juden. Hentrich: Berlín. .
 (2001). Der ungeschriebene Befehl. Hitler und der Weg zur „Endlösung“. Piper: Munich. .
 (2006). „Davon haben wir nichts gewusst!“ Die Deutschen und die Judenverfolgung 1933–1945. Siedler: Múnich. .
 (2008). Heinrich Himmler: Eine Biographie. Siedler: Munich. .
 (2010). Goebbels. Biographie. Siedler: Múnich. .
 (2015). Hitler. Biographie. Siedler: Múnich. .
 (2016). Wannseekonferenz. Der Weg zur „Endlösung“. Pantheon: Munich. .
 (2021). Antisemitismus: Eine deutsche Geschichte. Von der Aufklärung bis heute. Siedler: Munich. .
 (2022). Außer Kontrolle. Deutschland 1923. Molden, Wien 2022, .

References

External links 

 Page on Professor Peter Longerich at RHUL German Department website
 

Academics of Royal Holloway, University of London
Historians of the Holocaust
Historians of Nazism
People from Krefeld
1955 births
Living people
Scholars of antisemitism